Anestis Athanasiadis (born 7 September 1972) is a Greek former professional footballer.

References

1972 births
Living people
Greek footballers
Greek expatriate sportspeople in Sweden
AO Chania F.C. players
Ethnikos Piraeus F.C. players
Kavala F.C. players
Panetolikos F.C. players
Kalamata F.C. players
PAS Giannina F.C. players
Panserraikos F.C. players
Doxa Drama F.C. players
Association football forwards
Super League Greece players
People from Ängelholm Municipality